Karnataka, with a total population of 61,100,000, is one of the major states in South India. Kannada is the official language of Karnataka. Other linguistic minorities in the state are Tulu, Kodava, Konkani and Urdu. Karnataka is also in the forefront of population control measures with the world's first two birth control clinics being set up in 1930 in the Mandya district.

Population
According to the 2011 census of India, the total population of Karnataka is 6.25 crores. Of this,  50.9% are male and 49.1% are female. There is a decadal increase in population of 17.3% from 1991 to 2001. As per 2011 census, the Population density is 319 per km², the sex ratio is 973 females to 1000 males and 38.67% of the people in Karnataka live in urban areas. The literacy rate is 75.4% (as per the 2011 census). As per the 2001 census, the eight largest cities of Karnataka in order of their population are Bengaluru, Hubballi-Dharwad, Mysuru, Belagavi, Kalburgi, Mangaluru, Davanagere  and Ballari. The state has one of the largest populations of Anglo-Indians in India. Given below is a composite table of languages and religions of Karnataka at the census 2001
languages in karnataka

Bengaluru Urban and Belagavi are the most populous Districts, each of them having a population of more than three million. Gadaga, Chamarajanagara and Kodagu districts have a population of less than a million.

Religion

According to 2011 Census of India, 84.0% of the population are Hindu, 12.92% are Muslim, 1.87% are Christian, 0.7% are Jains, 0.2% are Buddhist, <0.1% are Sikhs, and remaining belong to other religions. Karnataka is also the location of some of tribes like, Nayaka, Soliga, and Yerava. The joint family system is prevalent in the rural areas of Karnataka and there are extreme cases like the Narasinganavars who reside in the Dharwad district and are recognised as one of the largest undivided families in the world.

Caste and Communities
Just like other Ethnolinguistic groups in India, Kannada speaking people also form a number of distinct communities. The two single biggest communities numerically are the Lingayat and the Vokkaliga from North and South Karnataka respectively, while Scheduled Castes make up the largest cohesive group of communities. There are also numerous OBC (other backward communities) including the former pastoralist community of Kuruba, Scheduled Tribes like the Boya/Valmiki, scheduled castes like Banjara and Adi Karnataka. Kannada Brahmins are divided into several communities. Although historically Jainism in Karnataka had dominant presence, Kannada Jains today form a small minority. In Karnataka, 5 communities — Brahmin, Jain, Aryavaishya, Nagarthas and Modaliars — are outside the existing reservation matrix.

Languages
Government Census (2001) Kannada 68.5 %, Urdu 10.5 %, Telugu 6.2 %,Tamil 3.2 %, Tulu 2.1 %, Hindi 2.6%, Konkani 1.0 %, Beary 1.3 %, other 4.1 %.

Districts

See also
 Karnataka ethnic groups
 Kannada people

Footnotes
Official Census Portal of Mysore District 

Karnataka society
Karnataka